Hua Mei (intended meaning: "China/USA")  (born  August 21, 1999) is a female giant panda. She is the first giant panda cub to survive to adulthood in the United States. She was born to Bai Yun (mother) and Shi Shi (father) at the San Diego Zoo. Millions of people around the world watched Hua Mei grow up via the zoo's Panda Cam.

Hua Mei is the elder half-sister to five other cubs born to Bai Yun: Mei Sheng, Su Lin, Zhen Zhen, Yun Zi and Xiao Liwu. These cubs' father is Gao Gao.

In February 2004, upon reaching adulthood, Hua Mei was relocated to the Wolong Reserve in Sichuan Province, China, where she is reportedly doing very well. By the end of 2007, she has given birth to 3 sets of twins: male twins Tuan Tuan and Mei Ling on September 1, 2004, male/female twins Wei Wei and Ting Ting on August 29, 2005, and another set of male twins, Hua Long and Hua Ao, on 16 July 2007.

After the 2008 Sichuan earthquake damaged much of the giant panda facility in Wolong, Hua Mei was relocated to the Bifengxia Panda Base in Ya'an. In July 2009, Hua Mei gave birth to a single female cub named Hao Hao.

Hua Mei delivered her eighth cub, a male named Yang Hu in September 2010. Then she gave birth to her ninth cub, a female named Jia Jia  in August 2012 and a tenth cub, a male, in July 2013.

In July 2018, she gave birth to a set of male/female twins named Yi Yi and Jiu Jiu. In October 2019, she gave birth to a set of female twins named Meng Meng and Jin Du Du.

See also
 List of giant pandas

Notes

External links
 Panda Profile at San Diego Zoo
 Photos of Hua Mei from birth through 3 years old

Individual giant pandas
1999 animal births
San Diego Zoo